"What About Love" is a song originally recorded by Canadian rock group Toronto, re-recorded in 1985 by the American rock group Heart.  The song was Heart's "comeback" single.  It was the first Heart track to reach the top 40 in three years, and their first top 10 hit in five.  It was released as the first single from the band's self-titled 1985 album, Heart, as well as their first hit single on their new record label, Capitol Records. Grace Slick and Mickey Thomas, co-lead vocalists of Starship at the time, provide additional background vocals on the song.

Background
The song was originally recorded in 1983 by Canadian rock group Toronto, of which songwriters Sheron Alton and Brian Allen were members. (The other songwriter, Jim Vallance, was not a member of Toronto, though he played drums on Toronto's recording of the song.) However, the rest of the band elected not to release the song, and the frustration Allen and Alton faced in being unable to convince their bandmates to feature this and other material on Toronto's albums led to their departure from the group.

Later, Michael McCarty at ATV Music Publishing was reviewing his song catalogue when he came across "What About Love".  He offered the song to Heart, who turned it into a worldwide hit.  Toronto's original version remained commercially unreleased until 2002, when it appeared as a bonus cut on the CDs Get It On Credit and Toronto: The Greatest Hits.

Reception
The song's sound marked a considerable change in the musical direction for Heart, moving from the hard rock and folk rock of their earlier work to a more polished, power ballad sound.  "What About Love" received extensive airplay on MTV and returned Heart to the top-10 of the U.S. Billboard Hot 100 for the first time in five years, peaking at No. 10.

The song peaked at No. 14 on the UK Singles Chart upon its re-release in 1988. Exclusively in its UK release, "What About Love" was also featured in an extended version on 12" and CD single versions.

Cash Box said of the single that it "retains the punch of [Heart's] hard rock tinged mid-’70s successes with a new vocal and melodic pliability," also saying that it has "less emphasis on guitar solos and more songwriting focus."

The song's chorus was featured in a series of Swiffer WetJet TV commercials from late 2010 into the following year. The campaign followed a series of previous Swiffer commercials using popular songs of the 1970s and 1980s.

Charts

Weekly charts

Year-end charts

Cover versions and samples
Mari Hamada covered the song in her 1985 album Blue Revolution.
On the compilation album of the 2006 season of American Idol, the song was performed by finalist Melissa McGhee. Janell Wheeler performed the song in Season 9 of the series. Season 11 Erika Van Pelt sang the song in the top 12 Girls night. In Season 12, Amber Holcomb sang it during the Top 7's Rock week.
Rick Ross samples "What About Love" in his song "Shot to the Heart."
Lil Wayne samples "What About Love" in his song "Something You Forgot."
On the TV show Pussycat Dolls Present: Girlicious, finalist Chrystina performs this song in the series finale, which eventually leads to her making the final group.
Rytmus samples "What About Love" in his song "Na Toto Som Cakal."
Kelly Clarkson covered the song during as part of her 2012 Stronger Tour, performing the song during a Boston, Massachusetts appearance.
Andy Lau once covered this song in Cantonese language, titled 永遠愛你 (Forever Loving You) which was taken on his second  solo album (情感的禁區/Forbidden Emotional)

References

Heart (band) songs
1982 songs
1985 singles
Hard rock ballads
Songs written by Jim Vallance
Song recordings produced by Ron Nevison
Capitol Records singles
1980s ballads